Seán Patrick O'Malley   (born June 29, 1944) is an American cardinal of the Catholic Church serving as archbishop of the Archdiocese of Boston in Boston since 2003. He is a member of the Order of Friars Minor Capuchin and was elevated by the Vatican to the rank of cardinal in 2006. 

Since its creation in 2013, O'Malley has been a member of the Council of Cardinal Advisers, formed by Pope Francis to help him govern the Catholic Church and reform its central administration. Since March 22, 2014, he has been a member of the Pontifical Commission for the Protection of Minors and as its president since December 17, 2014.

O'Malley previously served as bishop of the Diocese of Palm Beach in Florida (2002 to 2003), bishop of the Diocese of Fall River in Massachusetts (1992 to 2002), and bishop of the Diocese of Saint Thomas in the US Virgin Islands (1984 to 1992).

Biography

Early life
Seán Patrick O'Malley was born as Patrick O'Malley on June 29, 1944, in Lakewood, Ohio, the son of Theodore and Mary Louise (née Reidy) O'Malley. Both parents were of Irish descent. O'Malley, his sister, and his older brother grew up in South Hills of Pittsburgh, and Reading, Pennsylvania. At age 12, he entered St. Fidelis High School Seminary in Herman, Pennsylvania, a boarding school for students who were considering joining the Franciscan order. While there, in addition to studying the normal high school subjects, he also studied Spanish, Portuguese, Greek, German, and Hebrew, while also being active in theatre.

After graduating from St. Fidelis, he attended Capuchin College and the Catholic University of America, both in Washington, D.C. On July 14, 1965, at  age  21, O'Malley professed his vows in the Order of Friars Minor Capuchin and took the name Seán in honor of John the Apostle. After he was ordained a deacon, O'Malley spent a brief period in Easter Island, Chile.

Priesthood 
O'Malley was ordained a priest for the Order of Friars on August 29, 1970, at age 26, by Auxiliary Bishop John McDowell.  After his ordination, O'Malley graduated from Catholic University with a master's degree in religious education and a Ph.D. in Spanish and Portuguese literature.  He served as a professor at Catholic University from 1969 to 1973.

In 1973, O'Malley was asked to minister to Latinos at the Spanish Catholic Center in Washington, D.C. He opened a Spanish bookstore there and founded El Pregonero, the first Spanish language newspaper in the area.

In 1978, Cardinal William Baum appointed O'Malley as episcopal vicar for the Portuguese, Hispanic, and Haitian communities in the Archdiocese of Washington. He also became executive director of the archdiocesan Office of Social Ministry.  He says his daily prayers in Spanish.

Bishop of Saint Thomas

O'Malley was appointed coadjutor bishop of the Diocese of Saint Thomas in the U.S. Virgin Islands on May 30, 1984, by Pope John Paul II. He received his episcopal consecration on August 2, 1984, by Bishop Edward Harper, with Archbishop James Hickey and Bishop Eugene Marino serving as co-consecrators.

In 1985, O'Malley was also named knight commander of the Order of Infante D. Henrique by the Government of Portugal for his service to the Portuguese people in Washington.

O'Malley served as coadjutor bishop for one year and then automatically succeeded Harper as bishop on October 16, 1985 when he resigned. While in the Virgin Islands, O'Malley worked with the homeless and opened a home for people with HIV/AIDS. He was made an honorary chaplain of the Sovereign Military Order of Malta in 1991.

Bishop of Fall River

On June 16, 1992, John Paul II appointed O'Malley as bishop of the Diocese of Fall River. He was installed on August 11, 1992. As bishop, O'Malley first attempted to settle the sexual abuse scandal in the Fall River diocese.

In 1998, John Paul II appointed O'Malley to the Special Assembly for Oceania of the Synod of Bishops.

Bishop of Palm Beach

On September 3, 2002,  John Paul II appointed O'Malley as bishop of the Diocese of Palm Beach. He was installed on October 19, 2002.  O'Malley also tried to overcome the abuse scandal there. He also worked closely with the Portuguese and Hispanic population there.

Archbishop of Boston

Known as a fixer in various Roman Catholic dioceses plagued by sexual abuse scandals, John Paul II appointed O'Malley as archbishop of the Archdiocese of Boston on July 1, 2003.  He succeeded Cardinal Bernard Law, who had resigned as a consequence of the sexual abuse scandal there. 

On July 3, 2019, the archdiocese released a statement revealing that O'Malley had agreed to accept Pope Francis' request to stay on as Archbishop of Boston "for a few more years," despite the fact that O'Malley, as required, submitted his letter of resignation upon turning 75 years of age. Archdiocese spokesperson Terry Donilon said O'Malley was "really relieved" about the Vatican's decision and that "He loves being the archbishop of Boston and so we're pleased that that was settled right out of the box." The archdiocese statement also claimed that "The Cardinal is pleased to have the continued confidence of the Holy Father and looks forward to continuing to serve the people of God in Boston and in support of the Pope’s ministry in leading the universal church."

Cardinal

Pope Benedict XVI elevated O'Malley to the rank of cardinal-priest in the consistory of March 24, 2006. O'Malley was assigned the titular church of Santa Maria della Vittoria, Rome. The following May, O'Malley was named as a member of both the Congregation for the Clergy and the Congregation for Institutes of Consecrated Life and Societies of Apostolic Life in the Roman Curia. In late September 2009, he became a member of the Presidential Council of the Pontifical Council for the Family.

On September 19, 2006, O'Malley became the first cardinal with a personal blog. As of Christmas 2006 he began offering a regular podcast as well. He views the podcasts as "yet another tool [he] can use to reach the young people in our Church who more and more are turning to the Internet for their information."

O'Malley participated in the 2013 papal conclave, which elected Pope Francis, where he was among the cardinals considered papabile, that is, a contender for election to the papacy. As of 2021, O'Malley is the one of the four Capuchin members of the College of Cardinals.

On April 13, 2013, O'Malley was appointed to a group of eight cardinals established by Francis  a month after his election, to advise him and to study a plan for revising the Apostolic Constitution on the Roman Curia, Pastor bonus. The pope was already in contact with the members of this group.Along with then Cardinal Theodore McCarrick, O'Malley accompanied Francis to Cuba on September 20, 2015.

O'Malley praised the new tone of Francis' papacy. He stated however that those that expected change in doctrine from the pope on sexual ethics like abortion rights for women, contraception, and same-sex marriage would be disappointed. He also indicated that the church would not alter the ban on Communion for the divorced remarried and that he saw no theological justification for doing so.

On January 14, 2017, Pope Francis named O'Malley a member of the Congregation for the Doctrine of the Faith. On October 15, 2020, the pope renewed O'Malley's term on the Council of Cardinal Advisers.

Apostolic Visitor to Dublin
In June 2010, after the Ryan Report and Murphy Report on the abuses by the Church in Ireland, O'Malley was named along with others to oversee the apostolic visitation of certain dioceses and seminaries in Ireland. O'Malley was named as the visitor to the Archdiocese of Dublin and its dioceses of Ferns, Ossory, Kildare and Leighlin. He reported back to the Holy See on what steps had been taken since the reports were issued, and what else needs to happen.

Views

Abortion politics
In November 2007, O'Malley said that the Democratic Party has been persistently hostile to anti-abortion groups and that the fact many Catholic voters support Democratic candidates "borders on scandal." In a November 2008 interview, he said that, unless the Church formally excommunicated them, he would not deny communion to Catholic politicians in his diocese who support abortion rights for women. Despite criticism from conservative Catholics, including Commentator Raymond Arroyo of Eternal Word Television Network, of his participation in the funeral service for Senator Ted Kennedy, a long-standing supporter of abortion rights, O'Malley assisted at the funeral Mass and led a prayer. He called for less contentious political dialog: "We will not change hearts by turning away from people in their time of need and when they are experiencing grief and loss." He said he appreciated Kennedy's work for social justice, but that "there is a tragic sense of lost opportunity in his lack of support for the unborn".

Leadership Conference of Women Religious
On October 1, 2009, O'Malley wrote a letter on behalf of the Committee on Clergy, Consecrated Life and Vocations of the United States Conference of Catholic Bishops to the Leadership Conference of Women Religious (LCWR), then under investigation by the Congregation for the Doctrine of the Faith.  O'Malley praised a traveling exhibition created by LCWR that documented the work of nuns in the United States. He wrote that "the Church is grateful for all that your communities have done and continue to do to advance the mission of the Church, especially in the areas of health care, education, social services, and pastoral ministry, as are highlighted in the exhibit".

Sexual abuse policies
O'Malley has settled 101 abuse claims and has initiated a zero tolerance policy against sexual abuse. He also instituted one of the first comprehensive sexual abuse policies in the Roman Catholic Church. On December 5, 2013, O'Malley announced a pontifically approved commission, the Pontifical Commission for the Protection of Minors whose purpose is to prevent clerical sexual abuse and to help victims.  When the commission was established on March 22, 2014, O'Malley was named one of its first eight members. He supported the 2015 film Spotlight, which took an in-depth look at the wrongdoings of the Catholic Church in light of sexual abuse scandals.

Theodore McCarrick and St. John's Seminary controversies

In June 2018, it was revealed that O'Malley never responded to a letter from Boniface Ramsey, a New York priest, concerning sex abuse committed by then Cardinal McCarrick. Despite being required to enforce a zero-tolerance policy with regards to reporting sex abuse, O'Malley said the letter was handled by staff and was never forwarded to him.

Ramsey stated that he had reported the allegations against McCarrick to other Catholic officials before he sent his letter to O'Malley. During the time the letter was sent, McCarrick and O'Malley were both working with Cuban Cardinal Jaime Ortega to mend relations between the United States and Cuba.  McCarrick also accepted O'Malley's invitation to appear at the archdiocese  "Celebration of the Priesthood" fundraising dinner in South Boston in September 2015.

On August 10, 2018, allegations of sexual misconduct surfaced at St. John's Seminary in Boston. On August 15, 2018, it was announced that O'Malley would not attend the World Meeting of Families held in Dublin, Ireland between August 21 and August 26 in order to review these allegations.

Caritas Christi controversy
In 2009, Caritas Christi Health Care, which the Archdiocese of Boston owned, proposed contracting with Centene Corporation, a Missouri-based health insurer, to provide certain healthcare services, including abortion and pregnancy termination services, through a jointly-owned venture named Celticare. The new director of Caritas, Ralph de la Torre, announced the project as part of an effort to relieve the hospital system's financial problems while extending services to low income and underserved populations. In order for Caritas to participate in the Massachusetts state program CommonwealthCare, Caritas needed to provide access to mandated services, including some forbidden by Catholic teaching. Torre explained:

O'Malley asked the National Catholic Bioethical Center to review the contractual relationship, which theologians in a survey conducted by The Boston Globe in March had unanimously supported on the grounds that Catholic hospitals would not participate directly in providing abortion and the arrangement would allow Caritas to deliver much-needed services to the poor. The Catholic Action League of Massachusetts criticized the arrangement: "With Caritas Christi now thoroughly embedded in the culture of death, we are now facing the end, in Massachusetts at least, of Catholic medical resistance to abortion and contraception. This tragic state of affairs is the personal responsibility of the Archbishop of Boston, Cardinal Sean O'Malley."

In June 2009, Caritas Christi, at O'Malley's insistence, terminated its partial ownership of Celticare. O'Malley said:

Anti-abortion activist groups varied in their responses. Some praised O'Malley's decision, but others continued to object that Caritas, as a participant in CommonwealthCare, is still required, even as it refuses to provide abortions, to engage in abortion referrals.

Catholic Charities and gay adoption

Massachusetts has included sexual orientation in its anti-discrimination statute since 1989, and it legalized same-sex marriage beginning May 17, 2004. Between about 1985 and 1995, Catholic Charities of Boston, which accepted state funds in support of its adoption services program, placed 13 children with gay couples out of 720 adoptions. Catholic Charities President J. Bryan Hehir explained the practice: "If we could design the system ourselves, we would not participate in adoptions to gay couples, but we can't. We have to balance various goods." In December 2005, the lay-dominated board of Catholic Charities of Boston voted unanimously to continue gay adoptions. On March 10, 2006, after unsuccessfully seeking help from Governor Mitt Romney in obtaining an exemption from the state's anti-discrimination statute, O'Malley and leaders of Catholic Charities announced that the agency would terminate its adoption work effective June 30, rather than continue to place children under the guardianship of LBGT couples. He said "This is a difficult and sad day for Catholic Charities. We have been doing adoptions for more than 100 years."

Honours
 Grand-Cross of the Order of Prince Henry, Portugal (28 June 2016)

Bibliography
 EAN 560-3658113471

See also

 Catholic Church hierarchy
 Catholic Church in the United States
 Historical list of the Catholic bishops of the United States
 List of Catholic bishops of the United States
 Lists of patriarchs, archbishops, and bishops

References

External links

 
Cardinal Seán's blog
Boston Archdiocese page for Archbishop Seán O'Malley 

Photographs of Archbishop O'Malley at March 19, 2005 Boston Men's Conference

Catholic Pages
Biography of Archbishop O'Malley
Examination of the ring of O'Malley with pictures

1944 births
20th-century Roman Catholic bishops in the Caribbean
21st-century American cardinals
American Roman Catholic clergy of Irish descent
American bloggers
21st-century Roman Catholic archbishops in the United States
Roman Catholic bishops of Saint Thomas
Roman Catholic bishops of Palm Beach
Capuchins
Members of the Congregation for the Clergy
Members of the Congregation for Institutes of Consecrated Life and Societies of Apostolic Life
Living people
Catholic University of America alumni
People from Lakewood, Ohio
Cardinals created by Pope Benedict XVI
Members of the Pontifical Commission for the Protection of Minors
Recipients of the Order of Prince Henry
Roman Catholic archbishops of Boston
American anti-abortion activists
Catholic University of America faculty
Roman Catholic bishops of Fall River
Capuchin College alumni
Catholics from Ohio
American male bloggers
Capuchin cardinals
American Roman Catholic bishops by contiguous area of the United States